These are the late night schedules for the four United States broadcast networks that offer programming during this time period, from September 2013 to August 2014. All times are Eastern or Pacific. Affiliates will fill non-network schedule with local, syndicated, or paid programming. Affiliates also have the option to preempt or delay network programming at their discretion.

Legend

Schedule

Monday-Friday

NOTE: The Tonight Show with Jay Leno ended its second run on February 6, 2014, with The Tonight Show Starring Jimmy Fallon premiering on February 17, 2014. 
NOTE: Late Night with Jimmy Fallon ended on February 7, 2014, with Late Night with Seth Meyers premiering on February 24, 2014.

Saturday

By network

ABC

Returning series
ABC World News Now
Jimmy Kimmel Live!
Nightline

CBS

Returning series
Late Night with David Letterman
The Late Late Show with Craig Ferguson
Up to the Minute

FOX

Returning series
Animation Domination High-Def
Encore Programming

NBC

Returning series
Last Call with Carson Daly
Late Night with Jimmy Fallon
Mad Money 
Saturday Night Live
Today With Kathie Lee and Hoda 
The Tonight Show with Jay Leno

New series
Late Night with Seth Meyers
The Tonight Show Starring Jimmy Fallon

References

United States late night network television schedules
Late
Late